Joseph Shoesmith (sometimes rendered Shoosmith; 17 June 1859 – 9 April 1901) was an English cricketer.  Shoesmith's batting and bowling styles are unknown.  He was born at Kemp Town, Sussex.

Shoesmith made a single first-class appearance for Sussex against Yorkshire at Bramall Lane, Sheffield in 1881.  In Sussex's first-innings he was dismissed for 2 runs by Allen Hill.  He took the wicket of Hill in Yorkshire's first-innings, finishing with figures of 1/23 from 16 overs.  In Sussex's second-innings he ended unbeaten on 0, with Yorkshire going on to winning by 9 wickets.  This was his only major appearance for Sussex.

In 1881, he was shown in the Census as living with his parents at 2 Eastern Quadrant, Brighton. The family name is given as Shoesmith although CricketArchive in its profile of the player has rendered the name "Shoosmith". His father William was born at Lewes, Sussex and worked as a baker, muffin and crumpet maker.  He was aged 46 in 1881.  His mother Mary was born at Pembroke, Wales.  He had four sisters, two of which were employed as teachers.  He died at Brighton on 9 April 1901.

References

External links
Joseph Shoosmith at ESPNcricinfo
Joseph Shoosmith at CricketArchive

1859 births
1901 deaths
English people of Welsh descent
Sportspeople from Brighton
English cricketers
Sussex cricketers